John Robert Ridgeway III (born May 7, 1999) is an American football defensive tackle for the Washington Commanders of the National Football League (NFL). He played college football at Illinois State and Arkansas. Ridgeway was drafted by the Dallas Cowboys in the fifth round of the 2022 NFL Draft, but was released prior to his first game and signed with the Commanders.

Early life
Ridgeway grew up in Bloomington, Illinois, and attended Bloomington High School. At Bloomington, he played offensive tackle and defensive tackle on the football team, competed in the shot put and discus on the track and field team, and was a four-year letter winner on the wrestling team. Ridgeway was named first-team All-Big Twelve Conference on offense and first-team All-State on defense as a senior. He also won the state heavyweight wrestling championship.

College career
Ridgeway began his collegiate career at Illinois State, where he redshirted as a true freshman. During his redshirt season he focused on the defensive tackle position after initially being recruited to play on the offensive line. Ridgeway was named to the Missouri Valley Football Conference (MVFC) All-Newcomer team as a redshirt freshman after recording 30 tackles with one sack. He had 22 tackles with three tackles for loss and was named first-team All-MVFC in his redshirt junior season, which was shortened and played in the spring of 2021 due to the COVID-19 pandemic in the United States. After the season, he transferred to Arkansas.

Ridgeway was named the Razorback's starting nose guard going into the 2021 season, but missed the season opener due to an appendectomy. He finished the season with 39 tackles, two sacks and four tackles for loss, helping Arkansas finish 9-4 and ranked #21 in the AP Poll for the season after winning the 2022 Outback Bowl over Penn St. Ridgeway declared for the 2022 NFL Draft after the end of the season.

Professional career

Dallas Cowboys
Ridgeway was drafted by the Dallas Cowboys in the fifth round (178th overall) of the 2022 NFL Draft. He was waived on September 17, 2022.

Washington Commanders
Ridgeway was claimed off waivers by the Washington Commanders on September 19, 2022. In the Week 9 loss to the Minnesota Vikings, Ridgeway made a critical mistake for illegal contact with the long snapper on the Vikings' field goal attempt on fourth down with less than two minutes remaining in the game. The Commanders were flagged with an unnecessary roughness penalty giving the Vikings another first down, which allowed them to run out the clock before scoring a field goal and ending the game at a final score of 20-17. The following week, he forced a fumble out of tight end Dallas Goedert which was recovered by linebacker Jamin Davis ultimately helping to beat the then undefeated Philadelphia Eagles.

References

External links
 
 Washington Commanders bio
 Arkansas Razorbacks bio
 Illinois State Redbirds bio

1999 births
Living people
Players of American football from Illinois
American football defensive tackles
Arkansas Razorbacks football players
Illinois State Redbirds football players
Sportspeople from Bloomington, Illinois
Dallas Cowboys players
Washington Commanders players